The Botanischer Garten Solingen is a  botanical garden located at Vogelsang 2a, Solingen, North Rhine-Westphalia, Germany. It is open daily without charge.

Garden
The garden dates to 1952 when the city opened its first greenhouse on a 4-hectare site, with the garden itself opening in 1963. In 1965 the tropical house was built (143 m2, 8 meters in height), and in 1994-1995 the greenhouses were extended to 826 m2 by adding a cactus house and bromeliad house. In 2001 the garden was extended to over 6 hectares, and has gradually been handed off from city management to a nonprofit organization.

Today the garden's major sections are as follows:
 Alpinum - alpine garden including Alyssum, Arabis, Aster, Aubrieta, Campanula, Cyclamen, Delphinium, Gentiana, Geranium, Primula, Ranunculus gramineus, Saxifraga, Sedum, Sempervivum, etc.
 Mediterranean garden - plants from Southern Europe and Central America including fig, olive, and laurel trees, lavender, oregano, rosemary, sage, and thyme, as well as Cerastium and Potentilla.
 Greenhouses - tropical house (with palm trees, sugar cane, wild rice, coca, cinnamon, and a large aquarium); orchids from Nicaragua and Vietnam; a cactus house containing about 250 species; and bromeliad house with about 220 species of bromeliad, as well as banana tree, vanilla, carnivorous plants, and coffee.
 Cottage garden - a lawn with three maples and garden area (226 m2) patterned on descriptions of the Garden of Eden with four streams, containing flowers such as daffodil, foxglove, iris, lily of the valley, lupine, marigold, nasturtium, peony, phlox, yarrow, etc.
 Biblical Garden - eight beds, each a different geometric form, containing plants mentioned in the Bible, including barley, cistus, olive, pomegranate, wheat, etc.
 Flora Frey garden - garden donated by the Flora Frey company, with bulbs including Dahlia as well as Chionodoxa, Crocus, Eranthis, Erythronium, Fritillaria meleagris, Galanthus, Leucojum, Muscari, Narcissus, Puschkinia, Scilla, Tulipa, etc.
 Pergola - wild grapes, ivy, climbing hydrangea, and trumpet flower.
 Perennials garden - aster, daisy, larkspur, peony, etc.
 Rose Garden - about 100 rose varieties.
 Medicinal garden - about 40 medicinal plants known from antiquity to the Middle Ages including Malva sylvestris, marigold, peppermint, rosemary, etc.
 Herb Garden - herbs such as chives, mint, parsley, etc.
 Wild Bee Trail - an old orchard in which bees have a natural habitat.
 Fern walls - brick walls with Gymnocarpium robertianum.
 Heather garden - Calluna and Erica, as well as birch, yew, Forsythia, Ilex, Pieris, Rhododendron, Skimmia, etc.
 Pond area ([)] of which about [] is water) - Japanese cherry trees, with carp, goldfish, roach, three-spined stickleback, etc.
 Iris Garden - iris and daylily varieties.
 Reading room
 Primelgarten
 Conifers - A collection of conifers including Abies and Picea specimens, as well as Araucaria, Chamaecyparis, Cryptomeria, Larix pendula, and Metasequoia.

See also
 List of botanical gardens in Germany

External links
 Botanischer Garten Solingen
 Garden map

Solingen, Botanischer Garten
Solingen, Botanischer Garten